Grand Master of the Martial Arts is a 1981 card game published by Wind Warrior Co.

Gameplay
Grand Master of the Martial Arts is a card game in which players use cards to gain mastery of 15 unarmed martial arts.

Reception
Ronald Pehr reviewed Grand Master of the Martial Arts in The Space Gamer No. 53. Pehr commented that "Grand Master is [..] exciting, entertaining, and attractive to wargamers, role-players, budding martial artists, and anyone else willing to try it."

References

Card games introduced in 1981